Wayne Carew is a Canadian businessman and former politician in the province of Prince Edward Island.

A resident of Stanley Bridge, Carew was elected by acclamation as leader of the Prince Edward Island Liberal Party, then the Official Opposition in the Legislative Assembly of Prince Edward Island, in 1999 following the resignation of Keith Milligan.

Carew ran for a seat in the legislature in the 2000 general election but was not successful, giving him the distinction of being the only leader of the Liberal Party to not win a seat.

Carew resigned from leadership of the party following the 2000 election and was replaced by Ron MacKinley on an interim basis.

Carew is the president of Confederation M&A (formerly MRSB Mergers & Acquisitions).

References

Year of birth missing (living people)
Living people
People from Queens County, Prince Edward Island
Prince Edward Island Liberal Party leaders